William Sydney Hylton Jolliffe (27 September 1841 – 19 January 1912) was an English Conservative Party politician. 

Jolliffe was educated at Eton. He served in the Scots Guards and the North Somerset Yeomanry. He was the Member of Parliament for Petersfield from 1874 to 1880. He resided at 17 Lowndes Square when Parliament was siting and Heath House, Petersfield when it was in recess.

References

External links

A disgruntled petitioner

1841 births
1912 deaths
Conservative Party (UK) MPs for English constituencies
UK MPs 1874–1880
People educated at Eton College
North Somerset Yeomanry officers
Scots Guards officers
People from Petersfield
Jolliffe family